Echosmith is an American indie pop band formed in February 2009 in Chino, California. Originally formed as a quartet of siblings, the band currently consists of Sydney, Noah and Graham Sierota, following the departure of eldest sibling Jamie in 2016. Echosmith started first as "Ready Set Go!" until they signed to Warner Bros. Records in May 2012. They are best known for the song "Cool Kids", which reached number 13 on the Billboard Hot 100 and was certified triple platinum by the RIAA with over 1,200,000 sales in the United States and also double platinum by ARIA in Australia. The song was Warner Bros. Records' fifth-biggest-selling-digital song of 2014, with 1.3 million downloads sold. The band's debut album, Talking Dreams, was released on October 1, 2013.

Early life
The group grew up in a musical household playing multiple instruments throughout their childhood. The band has mentioned that numerous rock artists, including Coldplay, Echo & the Bunnymen, the Smiths, the Killers, U2, Joy Division and Fleetwood Mac influenced them while growing up and encouraged them to make music together. Echosmith's youngest sibling, Graham, plays drums. The only female member  in the group, Sydney, is co-lead vocalist for the band, often contributing on tambourine and keyboard. Noah plays bass and sings back-up vocals for the band. The oldest sibling, Jamie, was co-lead singer, and played guitar before he left the band in 2016. He later rejoined the band in 2022. Graham was diagnosed with autism as a child.

Career

Echosmith has also released an array of covers of songs such as "I Will Wait" by Mumford & Sons, "Lights" by Ellie Goulding, "Set Fire to the Rain" by Adele, and "Princess of China" by Coldplay and Rihanna. The band is currently managed by their father, producer and songwriter Jeffery David, who helped develop the band as well as co-writing the majority of the band's debut album. In April 2013, Echosmith was named one of the "100 Bands You Need To Know" by Alternative Press. On May 31, 2013, Echosmith released their new single on YouTube, "Come Together". The video was directed by Justin Coloma and filmed in Los Angeles, CA. Echosmith launched a Summer Sampler free download promo on their website, with the songs "Cool Kids", "Come Together", and "Talking Dreams".

On June 7, 2013, the band performed a free concert at Warner Bros. Records in Burbank, CA, with simultaneous streaming through Echosmith's YouTube channel. Echosmith was featured on ESPN's June programming. The featured songs consisted of "Come Together", "Let's Love", and "March Into The Sun." Echosmith also performed on the entire 2013 Vans Warped Tour. The band toured the United States and Canada as the opening act for Owl City on his 2013 Midsummer Station tour. The band's debut album, Talking Dreams, was released on October 8, 2013. Echosmith released a holiday track "I Heard the Bells on Christmas Day" on December 3, 2013. It was available to download for free on their website through the month of December. The band performed the song "Cool Kids" on December 31, 2013, during the Teen Nick top 10: New Year's Eve Countdown, hosted by Nick Cannon. Echosmith was selected as MTV's 2014 Artists To Watch. The band's song, "Surround You" was featured in the soundtrack for the film Endless Love.

Echosmith played on the Vans Warped Tour in 2014 for the second year in a row. Echosmith made their late night TV premiere in June 2014, performing "Cool Kids" on Conan and the Teen Wolf after-show, Wolf Watch. In 2015, Echosmith supported Twenty One Pilots on their national tour. On June 10, Echosmith released an acoustic EP, titled Acoustic Dreams, which features acoustic versions of four tracks off Talking Dreams, in addition to one new track titled "Terminal". Leading up to the release, the acoustic version of "Cool Kids" was premiered on the group's YouTube channel on June 3. Echosmith was the MTV Push Artist of the Month for November 2014. The band had a headline tour with The Colourist as their supporting act in February 2015. In 2015, Echosmith provided the vocals for Russian-German DJ and musician Zedd's track "Illusion", featured on his second studio album titled True Colors. In August, the band announced that Jamie Sierota would be taking a break from the band in preparation for fatherhood; session musician Josh Murty filled in on guitar for the band's tour dates. The band made a guest appearance in The Muppets episode "Single All the Way" (S1:E10), which originally aired December 8, 2015. In 2016 Sydney announced a collaboration with Hollister for a fashion line. In November 2016, the band announced via Twitter, Facebook and mail newsletter that Jamie will no longer be part of the band so that he can take care of his baby. They also stated they will continue as a trio. Also in 2016, Sydney collaborated with The Goo Goo Dolls on their song, "Flood", which can be found on their album Boxes.

Leading up to what was supposed to be the release of the band's sophomore album and corresponding tour, "Goodbye" was released as the lead single on July 14, 2017. One week later, the band performed their new single live for the first time at the 2017 MTV Fandom Awards during San Diego Comic-Con. Over the Summer, two additional singles, "Future Me" and "Dear World," were also released. After a prior announcement delaying the album and tour until Spring 2018, the Inside a Dream EP was released in its stead on September 29, 2017. With this release, "Get Into My Car" was featured as a promotional single with a corresponding music video. In March 2018, the band released a new lead single, "Over My Head," pushing the album to summer, and subsequently delaying it indefinitely. Later that Summer, the band opened for Pentatonix on their tour and rounded out the year with a Christmas show in San Diego on December 8, 2018. On March 8, 2019, Echosmith released their single "Favorite Sound," as a collaboration with musician Audien, as well as a cover of "Reflektor" by Arcade Fire, originally from 2013. Later that year, Echosmith and for KING & COUNTRY worked on a remix cover of "God Only Knows." Echosmith performed during the Magnificent Mile Lights Festival on November 23, 2019, in Chicago; the event was broadcast nationally. The band's second studio album, Lonely Generation, was released on January 10, 2020, via their Echosmith Music label under Warner Music Group. On May 28, 2022, Echosmith performed the English opening song of the 25th season of Pokémon the Series, "With You."

Band members
Current members
 Sydney Grace Ann Sierota  – lead and backing vocals, rhythm guitar, piano, keyboards (2009–present)
 Graham Jeffery David Sierota   – drums, percussion (2009–present)
 Noah Jeffery David Joseph Sierota   – bass, lead and backing vocals, synthesizer, programming (2009–present)
 Jamie Jeffery David Harry Sierota  – lead guitar, keyboards, synthesizer, programming, lead and backing vocals (2009–2016, 2022–present)

Touring musicians
 Josh Murty – guitar, backing vocals (2015–2017, 2019–present)
 Breanne Düren – keyboards, vocals (2017–present)
 Jacob Evergreen – guitar, backing vocals (2018–present)

Influences
Echosmith is described as an indie rock and 1980s dance-rock-influenced band. The band has cited Coldplay, U2, the Killers and the Smiths as influences. American Christian rock band Switchfoot has also been a big influence for the band and the reason they started making music.

Discography

Studio albums
 Talking Dreams (2013)
 Lonely Generation (2020)

Concert tours
Headlining
 Talking Dreams Tour (2014–2016)
 Inside a Dream Tour (2018)
 The Lonely Generation Tour (2020)
 The Hang Around Tour (2022)

Co-headlining
 The Midsummer Station (2013) 
 Vans Warped Tour (2013–2014) 
 Life is Beautiful (2014) 
 American Authors (2014) 

Opening act
 The Other Side Tour (2013) 
 Neon Trees Fall Tour (2014) 
 Lindsey Stirling 2014/2015 Tour (2015) 
 Blurryface Tour (2015) 
 PTX Presents Tour (2018)

References

External links

 
 

 
Rock music groups from California
Indie pop groups from California
American musical trios
Female-fronted musical groups
Sibling musical trios
Musical groups established in 2009
2009 establishments in California
Because Music artists
Warner Records artists